Robert Bolling Brandegee (April 4, 1849 - March 5, 1922) was an American painter and teacher active in Connecticut.

Brandegee was born in Berlin, Connecticut and perhaps studied with John Henry Hill and later with Thomas Charles Farrer. His early works were small-scale watercolors painted in the style of the Pre-Raphaelites but in April 1872 he moved to Paris to work under Louis Jacquesson de la Chevreuse and study at the École des Beaux-Arts. There he concentrated on portraiture and figure studies, but also painted genre, landscape, portraits, flowers, still lifes and allegorical subjects. In 1880 he returned to America, where he taught at Miss Porter's School in Farmington, Connecticut until 1903.

Brandegee exhibited at various venues including the Society of American Artists, the Exposition Universelle (1889), the Pennsylvania Academy of Fine Arts, the National Academy of Design, and elsewhere. Today he is remembered as an American Pre-Raphaelite strongly influenced by Frank Duveneck and the Munich School. He died in Farmington.

References 
 AskArt biography
 Farmington Historical Society biography
 Find-a-Grave entry

19th-century American painters
20th-century American painters
1849 births
1922 deaths
People from Berlin, Connecticut